The 2013 AMF Futsal Women's World Cup was the 2nd edition of the AMF Futsal Women's World Cup. The tournament was held in Colombia from 7 to 16 November in Barrancabermeja. Sixteen national teams from all confederations participated in the tournament. Colombia won the tournament by defeating Venezuela 3–2 in the final, achieving its first title.

Venues
Matches were played in one venue in Barrancabermeja.

Participating teams
In addition to host nation Colombia, 15 nations qualified.

1.Teams that made their debut.

Group stage
The group winners and runners up advanced to the quarter-finals.

Group A

Group B

Group C

Group D

Knockout stage

Quarter-finals

Semi-finals

Third place play-off

Final

Tournament team rankings

|-
| colspan="11"| Eliminated in the quarter-finals
|-

|-
| colspan="11"| Eliminated in the group stage
|-

References

AMF Futsal Women's World Cup
2013 in futsal
2013